= Santa Fe Yoga Festival =

Annual yoga festival in New Mexico, USA

Santa Fe Yoga Festival is an annual three-day yoga festival hosted in the city of Santa Fe, New Mexico. It was founded in 2012 by Kurt Young. Founding members include Pamela Serna and Kurt Young. The first festival was held in 2014 at the world-famous Bishops lodge in Santa Fe, NM. It had 40 yoga presenters and 108 classes ( this number is the equivalent of 108 beads on a mala). The music was presented by The Joey Lugassy Band. At the event, the movie "Awake" was premiered. David Frawley gave the invocation to commence the event. It was attended by 750 people. The second annual event was held at the Scottish Rite Temple in Santa Fe, NM. it featured the musical works of Michael Franti and Grace Potter. Notable yoga presenters included Tias Little, Surya Little and Mark Whitwell and Katchie Ananda. There were 40 yoga presenters in 2015. The event was attended by ( music, yoga or related events) 3500 people. The Third Festival was held at Scottish Rite temple and the Santa Fe Plaza. Over 4500 people attended the event. Featured Yoga instructors were Tias and Surya Little, Katchie Ananda, Jennifer Elliot. Music performed by many bands, the Main musical Act was.
